This is an incomplete list of lakes of Yukon, a territory of Canada.

List of lakes
 Aishihik Lake
 Alligator Lake
 Atlin Lake (in British Columbia and Yukon)
 Bennett Lake (in British Columbia and Yukon)
 Coghlan Lake
 Dezadeash Lake
 Finlayson Lake 
 Frances Lake 
 Frenchman Lake
 Kluane Lake
 Kusawa Lake
 Lake Laberge
 Marsh Lake 
 Mary Lake 
 Mayo Lake
 McEvoy Lake
 McQuesten Lake
 Moose Ponds
 Nares Lake
 Quiet Lake
 Schwatka Lake
 Snafu Lake
 Spirit Lake
 Tagish Lake (in British Columbia and Yukon)
 Tarfu Lake
 Teslin Lake (in British Columbia and Yukon)
 Ts'oogot Gaay Lake
 Lake Wellesley
 Wolf Lake

References

Yukon
Lakes